was a Japanese philosopher. He was a scholar of the Kyoto School and a disciple of Kitarō Nishida. In 1924, Nishitani received his doctorate from Kyoto Imperial University for his dissertation "Das Ideale und das Reale bei Schelling und Bergson". He studied under Martin Heidegger in Freiburg from 1937 to 1939.

Career
Nishitani held the principal Chair of Philosophy and Religion at Kyoto University from 1943 until becoming emeritus in 1964. He then taught philosophy and religion at Ōtani University. At various times Nishitani was a visiting professor in the United States and Europe.

According to James Heisig, after being banned from holding any public position by the United States Occupation authorities in July 1946, Nishitani refrained from drawing "practical social conscience into philosophical and religious ideas, preferring to think about the insight of the individual rather than the reform of the social order."

In James Heisig's Philosophers of Nothingness Nishitani is quoted as saying "The fundamental problem of my life … has always been, to put it simply, the overcoming of nihilism through nihilism."

Thought 
On Heisig's reading, Nishitani's philosophy had a distinctive religious and subjective bent, drawing Nishitani close to existentialists and mystics, most notably Søren Kierkegaard and Meister Eckhart, rather than to the scholars and theologians who aimed at systematic elaborations of thought.  Heisig further argues that Nishitani, "the stylistic superior of Nishida," brought Zen poetry, religion, literature, and philosophy organically together in his work to help lay the difficult foundations for a breaking free of the Japanese language, in a similar way to Blaise Pascal or Friedrich Nietzsche. Heisig argues that, unlike Nishida who had supposedly focused on building a philosophical system and who towards the end of his career began to focus on political philosophy, Nishitani focused on delineating a standpoint "from which he could enlighten a broader range of topics," and wrote more on Buddhist themes towards the end of his career.

In works such as Religion and Nothingness, Nishitani focuses on the Buddhist term Śūnyatā (emptiness/nothingness) and its relation to Western nihilism. To contrast with the Western idea of nihility as the absence of meaning Nishitani's Śūnyatā relates to the acceptance of anatta, one of the three Right Understandings in the Noble Eightfold Path and the rejection of the ego in order to recognize the Pratītyasamutpāda, to be one with everything. Stating: "All things that are in the world are linked together, one way or the other. Not a single thing comes into being without some relationship to every other thing." However, Nishitani always wrote and understood himself as a philosopher akin in spirit to Nishida insofar as the teacher—always bent upon fundamental problems of ordinary life—sought to revive a path of life walked already by ancient predecessors, most notably in the Zen tradition.  Nor can Heisig's reading of Nishitani as "existentialist" convince in the face of Nishitani's critique of existentialism—a critique that walked, in its essential orientation, in the footsteps of Nishida's "Investigation of the Good" (Zen no Kenkyū).

Among the many works authored by Nishitani in Japanese, are the following titles: Divinity and Absolute Negation (Kami to zettai Mu; 1948), Examining Aristotle (Arisutoteresu ronkō; 1948); Religion, Politics, and Culture (Shūkyō to seiji to bunka; 1949); Modern Society's Various Problems and Religion (Gendai shakai no shomondai to shūkyō; 1951); Regarding Buddhism (Bukkyō ni tsuite; 1982); Nishida Kitaro: The Man and the Thought (Nishida Kitarō, sono hito to shisō; 1985); The Standpoint of Zen (Zen no tachiba; 1986); Between Religion and Non-Religion (Shūkyō to hishūkyō no aida; 1996).  His written works have been edited into a 26-volume collection Nishitani Keiji Chosakushū (1986-1995). A more exhaustive list of works is accessible on the Japanese version of the present wikipage.

List of works
Collected Works [西谷啓治著作集] 26 vols. (Tokyo: Sōbunsha [創文社], 1986–95) [CW].

CW1: Philosophy of Fundamental Subjectivity, Vol. 1 [根源的主体性の哲学 正] (Tokyo: Kōbundō [弘文堂], 1940)
 Part I: Religion and Culture [宗教と文化]
 ‘Nietzsche’s Zarathustra and Meister Eckhart’ [ニイチェのツァラツストラとマイスター・エックハルト] (Festschrift for Professor Hatano Sei’ichi [哲学及び宗教とその歴史——波多野精一先生献呈論文集], Iwanami Shoten, September 1938)
 ‘Religion, History, Culture’ [宗教・歴史・文化] (Tetsugaku Kenkyū [哲学研究], No. 250, January 1937)
 ‘Modern Consciousness and Religion’ [近代意識と宗教] (Keizai Ōrai [経済往来], Vol. 10, No. 7, July 1935)
 ‘Modern European Civilisation and Japan’ [近世欧羅巴文明と日本] (Shisō [思想], No. 215-16, April–May 1940)
 Part II: History and Nature [歴史と自然]
 ‘Timeliness and Untimeliness in Morality’ [道徳における時代性と恒常性] (Risō [理想], No. 48, 1933)
 ‘The Historical and the Congenital’ [歴史的なるものと先天的なるもの] (Shisō [思想], No. 109-10, June–July 1931)
 ‘Patterns of Human Interpretation and Their Significance’ [人間解釈の類型性とその意義] (Risō [理想], No. 55-56, 1935)
 ‘Individuality and Universality in Life’ [生における個別と一般] (Ōtani Gakuhō [大谷学報], Vol. 12, No. 3, October 1931)

CW2: Philosophy of Fundamental Subjectivity, Vol. 2 [根源的主体性の哲学 続]
 Part III: Thought and Will [思惟と意志]
 ‘On the Problem of Evil’ [悪の問題について] (Tetsugaku Kenkyū [哲学研究], No. 142, 1928)
 ‘Schelling’s Identity Philosophy and the Will: The Real and the Ideal’ [シェリングの同一哲学と意志——実在的なるものと観念的なるもの] (Tetsugaku Kenkyū [哲学研究], No. 104-5, 1924)
 ‘Transcendentality of the Object: Spiritualism of No Spirit’ [対象の超越性——無心の唯心論] (Shisō [思想], No. 44, June 1925)
 ‘Kant’s Aesthetic Ideas: The Link between Intuition and Feeling’ [カントの審美的理念——直観と感情との聯関] (Shisō [思想], No. 51, January 1926)
 ‘Miscellaneous Thoughts on Religion’ [宗教雑感] (Shisō [思想], No. 77, March 1928)
 ‘Dialectic of Religious Existence’ [宗教的実存の弁証法] (Shisō [思想], No. 159-61, August–October 1935)

CW3: Studies on Western Mysticism [西洋神秘思想の研究]
 ‘A History of Mysticism’ [神秘思想史] (Iwanami Kōza: Tetsugaku [岩波講座・哲学], Vol. 4, 1932)
 ‘Mysticism’s Ethical Thought’ [神秘主義の倫理思想] (Iwanami Kōza: Rinrigaku [岩波講座・倫理学], Vol. 14, 1941)
 ‘The Problem of Mysticism’ [神秘主義の問題] (Tetsugaku Kenkyū [哲学研究], No. 334, 1944)
 ‘Mysticism’ [神秘主義] (Gendai Kirisutokyō Kōza [現代キリスト教講座], Vol. 4, 1956)
 ‘Plotinus’ Philosophy’ [プロティノスの哲学] (Naganoken Suwa Tetsugakukai [長野県諏訪哲学会], Summer 1929)
 ‘The Problem of Evil in Augustine’ [アウグスティヌスにおける悪の問題] (Tetsugaku [哲学], Vol. 1, No. 3, 1946)
 ‘The Problem of Knowledge in Augustine’ [アウグスティヌスにおける知の問題] (Kirisutokyō Bunka [基督教文化], No. 31,  November 1948)
 ‘Augustine and the Position of Contemporary Thought’ [アウグスティヌスと現代の思想境位] (Kirisutokyō Bunka [基督教文化], No. 34, March 1949)

CW4: Contemporary Society’s Problems and Religion [現代社会の諸問題と宗教]
 Part I: Contemporary Society’s Problems and Religion [現代社会の諸問題と宗教]
 Religion, Politics and Culture [宗教と政治と文化] (Kyoto: Hōzōkan [法蔵館], 1949)
 ‘Problems of Contemporary Religion’ [現代における宗教の諸問題]
 Contemporary Society’s Problems and Religion [現代社会の諸問題と宗教] (Kyoto: Hōzōkan [法蔵館], 1951)
 Part II: Philosophy of World History and Historical Consciousness [世界史の哲学と歴史的意識]
 ‘Philosophy of World History’ [世界史の哲学]
 Worldview and Stateview [世界観と国家観] (Tokyo: Kōbundō [弘文堂], 1941)
 ‘Historical Consciousness’ [歴史的意識]

CW5: Aristotle Studies [アリストテレス論考] (Tokyo: Kōbundō [弘文堂], 1948)
 ‘Aristotle’s Theory of Sensation’ [アリストテレスの感性論]
 ‘Aristotle’s Theory of Imagination’ [アリストテレスの構想論]
 ‘Aristotle’s Theory of the Intellect’ [アリストテレスの理性論]

CW6: Philosophy of Religion [宗教哲学]
 ‘Prolegomena to Philosophy of Religion’ [宗教哲学——序論]
 ‘Religion and Philosophy’ [宗教と哲学]
 ‘Introduction to Philosophy of Religion’ [宗教哲学——研究入門]
 ‘Marxism and Religion’ [マルクシズムと宗教]
 ‘The Problem of Evil’ [悪の問題]
 ‘Buddhism and Christianity’ [仏教とキリスト教]
 ‘The Problem of Mythology’ [神話の問題]
 ‘The Transethical’ [倫理を超えるもの]
 ‘Science and Religion’ [科学と宗教]

CW7: God and the Absolute Nothing [神と絶対無]
 God and the Absolute Nothing [神と絶対無] (Tokyo: Kōbundō [弘文堂], 1948)
 ‘German Mysticism and German Philosophy’ [ドイツ神秘主義とドイツ哲学]

CW8: Nihilism [ニヒリズム]
 Nihilism [ニヒリズム] (Tokyo: Kōbundō [弘文堂], 1949)
 ‘Nihilism and Existence in Nietzsche’ [ニイチェにおけるニヒリズム＝実存]
 Russian Nihilism [ロシアの虚無主義] (Tokyo: Kōbundō [弘文堂], 1949)
 ‘Problems of Atheism’ [無神論の問題]

CW9: Nishida’s Philosophy and Tanabe’s Philosophy [西田哲学と田辺哲学]
 Nishida Kitarō [西田幾多郎] (Tokyo: Chikuma Shobō [筑摩書房], 1985)
 ‘On Tanabe’s Philosophy’ [田辺哲学について]
 ‘Professor Tanabe’s Thought in His Final Years’ [田辺先生最晩年の思想]

CW10: What Is Religion: Essays on Religion, Vol. 1 [宗教とは何か——宗教論集I] (Tokyo: Sōbunsha [創文社], 1961)
 ‘What Is Religion’ [宗教とは何か]
 ‘Personhood and Non-Personhood in Religion’ [宗教における人格性と非人格性]
 ‘Nihil and Śūnyatā’ [虚無と空]
 ‘The Position of Śūnyatā’ [空の立場]
 ‘Śūnyatā and Time’ [空と時]
 ‘Śūnyatā and History’ [空と歴史]

CW11: The Standpoint of Zen: Essays on Religion, Vol. 2 [禅の立場——宗教論集II] (Tokyo: Sōbunsha [創文社], 1986)

CW12: Hanshan’s Poetry [寒山詩] (Tokyo: Chikuma Shobō [筑摩書房], 1986)

CW13: Philosophical Studies [哲学論考]
 ‘The Problem of Being and the Problem of Ontology’ [存在の問題と存在論の問題]
 ‘Prajñā and Reason’ [般若と理性]
 ‘On Satori’ [「覚」について]
 ‘Śūnyatā and Pṛthak’ [空と即]
 ‘Schelling’s Absolute Idealism and Bergson’s Pure Duration’ [シェリングの絶対的観念論とベルグソンの純粋持続]
 ‘A Brief Biography of Schelling’ [シェリング略伝]
 ‘Schelling and Bergson: A Survey of Their Works’ [シェリング及びベルグソン（著作解題）]

CW14: Lectures on Philosophy, Vol. 1 [講話 哲学I]

CW15: Lectures on Philosophy, Vol. 2 [講話 哲学II]

CW16: Lectures on Religion [講話 宗教]

CW17: Lectures on Buddhism [講話 仏教]

CW18: Lectures on Zen and Jōdo [講話 禅と浄土]

CW19: Lectures on Culture [講話 文化]

CW20: Occasional Essays, Vol. 1 [隨想I]

CW21: Occasional Essays, Vol. 2 [隨想II]

CW22: Lectures on Shōbōgenzō, Vol. 1 [正法眼蔵講話I]

CW23: Lectures on Shōbōgenzō, Vol. 2 [正法眼蔵講話II]

CW24: Lectures at Ōtani University, Vol. 1 [大谷大学講義I]

CW25: Lectures at Ōtani University, Vol. 2 [大谷大学講義II]

CW26: Lectures at Ōtani University, Vol. 3 [大谷大学講義III]

English translations
Monographs

 Nishitani Keiji. 1982. Religion and Nothingness. Translated by Jan Van Bragt. Berkeley: University of California Press.
 Nishitani Keiji. 1990. The Self-Overcoming of Nihilism. Translated by Graham Parkes and Aihara Setsuko. Albany: State University of New York Press.
 Nishitani Keiji. 1991. Nishida Kitarō. Translated by Yamamoto Seisaku and James W. Heisig. Berkeley: University of California Press.
 Nishitani Keiji. 2006. On Buddhism. Translated by Yamamoto Seisaku and Robert E. Carter. Albany: State University of New York Press.
 Nishitani Keiji. 2012. The Philosophy of Nishitani Keiji 1900-1990 - Lectures on Religion and Modernity. Translated by Jonathan Morris Augustine and Yamamoto Seisaku. New York: The Edwin Mellen Press.

Articles

 Nishitani Keiji. 1960. ”The Religious Situation in Present-day Japan.” Contemporary Religions in Japan, 7-24.
 Nishitani Keiji. 1984. ”Standpoint of Zen.” Translated by John C. Maraldo. The Eastern Buddhist 17/1, 1–26.
 Nishitani Keiji. 1989. ”Encounter with Emptiness.” In The Religious Philosophy of Nishitani Keiji (edited by Taitetsu Unno). Jain Publishing Company. 1-4.
 Nishitani Keiji. 1990. "Religious-Philosophical Existence in Buddhism." Translated by Paul Shepherd. The Eastern Buddhist (New Series) 23, 1-17.
 Nishitani Keiji. 2004a. ”The Awakening of Self in Buddhism.” In The Buddha Eye - An Anthology of the Kyoto School and Its Contemporaries (edited by Frederick Franck). World Wisdom: Bloomington, Indiana. 11–20.
 Nishitani Keiji. 2004b. ”The I-Thou Relation in Zen Buddhism.” In The Buddha Eye - An Anthology of the Kyoto School and Its Contemporaries (edited by Frederick Franck). World Wisdom: Bloomington, Indiana. 39–53.
 Nishitani Keiji. 2004c. ”Science and Zen.” In The Buddha Eye - An Anthology of the Kyoto School and Its Contemporaries (edited by Frederick Franck). World Wisdom: Bloomington, Indiana. 107–135.
 Nishitani Keiji. 2008. ”My Views on ”Overcoming Modernity”." In Overcoming Modernity - Cultural Identity in Wartime Japan (translated and edited by Richard Calichman). New York: Columbia University Press. 51-63.

Notes

References
 James Heisig, Philosophers of Nothingness, Honolulu: University of Hawai'i Press, 2001,

External links
 

1900 births
1990 deaths
20th-century Japanese philosophers
Academic staff of Kyoto University
Buddhism and other religions
Buddhist existentialists
Existentialists
Japanese scholars of Buddhism
Kyoto School
Kyoto University alumni
Ontologists
People in interfaith dialogue
Philosophers of nihilism
Philosophers of religion